Madea Goes to Jail is a 2009 American comedy-drama film written and directed by Tyler Perry, which was based on his 2006 play, and starring Perry, Derek Luke, Keshia Knight Pulliam, Ion Overman, RonReaco Lee, Sofía Vergara, Vanessa Ferlito, and Viola Davis. The film tells the story of Madea going to prison for her uncontrollable anger management problems as she befriends a young incarcerated prostitute that an assistant district attorney knows since college. The film was released on February 20, 2009. It is the fourth film in the Madea cinematic universe as it follows up from the cameo appearance of Madea in the previous film Meet the Browns and it features Cora and Mr. Brown from that film.

Madea Goes to Jail received negative reviews from critics, but was a box office success, grossing $90.5 million worldwide against a $17.5 million budget.

Plot

After a high-speed freeway police chase (seen in Meet the Browns) results in Madea (Tyler Perry) being pulled over and arrested, the D.A.'s office is briefed on her.

Assistant district attorney Joshua Hardaway (Derek Luke) is on the fast track to career success. He is prosecuting a young prostitute and drug addict, Candace "Candy" Washington-Collins (Keshia Knight Pulliam), with whom he is already acquainted. Josh asks his fiancée and fellow ADA Linda Davis (Ion Overman) to fill in on his behalf before Judge Mablean Ephriam. When it comes to Madea's turn with Brian (Tyler Perry) mentioning that the police officers failed to read her Miranda warning, she admits her permanent license suspension and Judge Ephriam places her in an anger management course. Returning home from court with Cora (Tamela Mann) and Leroy Brown (David Mann), Madea finds a party taking place in her house hosted by her brother Joe (Tyler Perry) who claims he threw the party to try and cheer up Madea. However, Madea isn't amused by the festivities and uses a machine gun to scare the party goers away.

Josh later takes Candy out to eat and gives her his business card for future assistance. This causes Linda to get jealous and fear Josh may be cheating on her. Although Josh tries to assure her that he is only trying to help an old friend, Linda tells him that it was Candace's own fault for being who she is and that he should only socialize with a higher class of people. Conversely, Candace sees right through Linda upon meeting her and tells Josh that it will never work between them since they are too different: Linda is a spoiled brat who considers people who have a lower status than her as inferior, while Josh actually cares about helping anyone he sees in trouble.

Driving to Madea's anger management counseling, another car cuts ahead of Cora's car fueling Madea's aggression. While Cora tries to remain calm, reminding herself and Madea with her WWJD bracelet, Madea attempts to kill that driver by lurching Cora's car into the car ahead. Madea consults with Dr. Phil McGraw for anger management, but does not cooperate with McGraw, as he tells Cora that he'll be filing this report to the judge.

Meanwhile, Josh keeps helping Candace to the points of rescuing her from pimp Arthur (Benjamín Benítez) who harassed her and her fellow prostitute friend Donna (Vanessa Ferlito). He manages to bring her to his apartment, which makes Linda angry and she threatens to leave Josh unless he cuts Candace out of his life for good.

At Madea's house, Madea calls Cora, who is at the hair salon, to drive her to the store to get some groceries. Cora refuses to cut her appointment short, angering Madea. Joe warns that Madea will get into trouble if she drives to the store herself, but she ignores him and goes anyway. At Kmart in Mableton, Georgia, a woman steals the parking space that Madea was about to take and acts very snobbish to Madea when she confronts the woman over it, so Madea commandeers a forklift truck to remove the woman's car from the space, wrecking the car in the process. Madea then flees back home as the woman calls her police officer husband.

Josh later runs into his friend Ellen (Viola Davis), a former drug addict and prostitute who has now become a minister who helps other women get off the streets. After Josh asks Ellen to help Candace, Ellen gets her a job interview, but it results in sexual harassment by Mr. Brackman (Jackson Walker), whom Candace kicks in the groin before storming out. Upon discovering this, Ellen becomes angry at him for setting Candace back. Josh and Linda later find Candace strung out at his front door, bringing her into his home. Linda begins to feel like Josh loves Candace and becomes upset.

That same evening at Madea's house, she is waiting on her front lawn when the police arrive and is arrested after being tackled.

At the district attorney's office, Josh's best friend Chuck (RonReaco Lee) runs into Linda and discovers that she is falsifying Candace's file to deliberately get her sent to prison and away from Josh, a practice she has engaged with other defendants as well, including Madea. Linda blackmails him to keep his mouth shut under the threat of telling their boss Fran (Aisha Hinds) that Chuck cheated on his bar exam to get his law license.

The next day, Ellen later asks Josh how he knows Candace. He tells Ellen that they were close friends from childhood through college, but during their college years, all of Josh's friends mistreated and bullied Candace because of her background and he started pushing her away out of embarrassment. He breaks down when he talks about one particular night when he took her to a party at his friends' insistence, where they gang-raped her after he left to go on a date. Since then, Josh has continued to harbor deep-seated guilt for leaving her behind and failing to protect her. Ellen comforts him and tells him that he shouldn't continue holding on to the guilt and that it was never his fault, especially since Candace already had personal troubles beforehand.

At Madea's trial, Brian informs Madea that Judge Ephriam isn't overseeing her case this time. The judge in question is Greg Mathis who sentences her to prison for five to ten years.

Linda mentions to Josh that Candace missed her trial and the judge gave her a seventeen-year prison sentence. She also lies that she "tried" to be lenient, but that the case was too severe. Chuck overhears this and nearly tells Josh the truth, but hesitates because of Linda's previous threat towards him. Having returned to prostitution, Candace is arrested by an undercover detective.

While in DeKalb County Prison, Candace reunites with Donna and reveals her long prison sentence. Madea gains serial killer T.T. (Sofía Vergara) as a cellmate and befriends Candace, coming to her defense when she is sexually harassed by prison "boss" Big Sal (Robin Coleman). Candace, Madea, T.T., Big Sal, and Donna later attend a class taught by Ellen at the prison in order to have time reduced from their sentences. During a lesson about forgiveness, Madea notices that some of the inmates would rather play victim instead of taking responsibility for their crimes. She tells the class they need to stop seeing themselves as victims and forgive those who led them onto the bad paths they've been on, as they weren't the ones who ended up in jail.

Moved by Madea's words, Candace confronts Josh during a visit from him; she reveals that back when she was raped at the party he took her to, she called his name repeatedly, yet he never came. She subsequently allowed her anger at him and the trauma from the rape to consume her, which led to her dropping out of school and becoming a drug addict and prostitute. But with everything she learned from Ellen and Madea, she finally decides to forgive Josh and pick up the pieces of her life.

On Josh's wedding day, Chuck, serving as best man, tells him that Linda falsified Candace's file. During the ceremony, an appalled Josh tells the congregation, including Fran, the Mayor and the Governor what Linda has done and jilts her at the altar, to Chuck's satisfaction. He then rushes to the prison where he professes to Candace that he loves her and will help her get out of jail and restore her life.

Josh publicly exposes Linda's tampering with client files to radio shows, The View, and other mainstream media, triggering a mass protest movement to set free those she wrongfully convicted. It's implied Linda was fired from her job and disbarred, while a news update reveals that she has been indicted for her crimes and will face arrest, trial and prison. Candace, Madea, and five other women that Linda prosecuted have their convictions overturned and are released. Madea is picked up by Cora, Mr. Brown, and Brian while Candace and Josh walk out of the prison together and share a kiss in front of the press.

During the credits, there are more scenes with Madea and Dr. Phil.

Cast
 Tyler Perry as:
 Mabel "Madea" Simmons, a tough old lady.
 Joe Simmons, Madea's brother.
 Brian Simmons, a lawyer who is Madea's nephew and Joe's son.
 Derek Luke as Joshua Hardaway, an assistant district attorney.
 Keshia Knight Pulliam as Candace "Candy" Washington-Collins, a prostitute and former friend of Joshua.
 Ion Overman as Linda Davis, an envious assistant district attorney and Joshua's fiancé who secretly commits illegal activities like fraud, evidence tampering, and providing false legal documents involving some of the people she prosecuted.
 RonReaco Lee as Chuck, an assistant district attorney and Joshua's friend.
 Sofía Vergara as Terry "T.T.", a female serial killer that becomes Madea's cellmate.
 Vanessa Ferlito as Donna, a prostitute and Candace's friend.
 Viola Davis as Ellen Holmes, a minister who used to be a prostitute.
 Tamela Mann as Cora Simmons, Madea's daughter.
 David Mann as Mr. Brown, Cora's father.
 Bobbi Baker as Tanya, Linda's friend
 Aisha Hinds as Fran, the head assistant district attorney who is Joshua, Linda, and Chuck's boss.
 Leon Lamar as an old man at Joe's party.
 Benjamín Benítez as Arthur, a pimp that harasses Candy.
 Jackson Walker as Mr. Brackman, a man who interviews Candy for a job.
 Robin Coleman as Big Sal, a tough inmate and prison "boss" that runs afoul of Madea.
 Karan Kendrick as Watson, a prison officer at DeKalb County Prison.

Cameos
 Phil McGraw as Himself, he acts as Madea's anger management counselor.
 Mablean Ephriam as Herself, a judge that sentences Madea to anger management.
 Greg Mathis as Himself, a judge that sentences Madea to 5 to 10 years in prison.
 Al Sharpton as Himself, he talks about the actions of Linda on Keepin' It Real with Al Sharpton.
 Whoopi Goldberg as Herself, she appears on The View talking about Madea.
 Sherri Shepherd as Herself, she appears on The View talking about Madea.
 Elisabeth Hasselbeck as Herself, she appears on The View talking about Madea.
 Joy Behar as Herself, she appears on The View talking about Madea.
 Tom Joyner as Himself, a radio show host that talks about the actions of Linda.
 Steve Harvey as Himself, he talks about the actions of Linda on The Steve Harvey Morning Show.
 Michael Baisden as Himself, a radio personality who talks about the actions of Linda.  He labeled Madea, Candace, and the other 5 inmates as the Georgia Seven, while also referencing the Jena Six.
 Frank Ski as Himself, a radio personality who talks about the actions of Linda.

Release

Critical reception
The film received negative reviews from critics, with a Rotten Tomatoes score of 29% based on 52 reviews, and an average score of 4.90/10. The consensus says, "Divided between sincere melodrama and populist comedy, Madea Goes to Jail fails to provide enough laughs – or screen time – for its titular heroine." Metacritic gives the film a score of 50%, based on 13 reviews, indicating "mixed or average reviews". Audiences surveyed by CinemaScore gave the film a grade "A" on scale of A to F.

Sam Adams of the Chicago Tribune gave the film 2.5/4 stars and wrote that "if the movie is a mess, it's a purposeful mess, cannily, if not artfully, pushing all the right buttons to ensure Perry will be back for another round."

According to a New York Times review, the film gives Madea herself a much more central role than some of the previous Madea movies, in some of which she is merely a commentator on events.

The Boston Globe reported that "(Madea's) character epitomizes Perry's ongoing commitment to dramatizing as many rungs on the ladder of the black experience as he can. His aim never produces a completely satisfying or consistently competent-looking movie (his heart's in the right place, if not his camerawork)."

Box office
On its opening weekend, the film opened at #1, and grossed $41,030,947 (2,032 theaters, $20,192 average), the biggest Friday to Sunday take since Twilight in November 2008. It broke Madea's Family Reunion weekend gross at $30 million as the highest weekend gross for a Tyler Perry film. It broke Saw IIIs record at $33 million for the highest weekend gross for Lionsgate Entertainment. "We were cautiously optimistic we could do 30-plus," Steve Rothenberg said. On its second weekend, it dropped 61 percent, but remained at #1 grossing another $16,175,926 (2,052 theaters, $7,883 average), bringing the 10-day gross to $64,525,548. The film closed on April 23, 2009 with a final domestic gross of $90,508,336.

Home media
An exclusive preview was included on the cinematic release of Tyler Perry's The Family That Preys.

Madea Goes to Jail was released on June 16, 2009 on DVD in both full-screen and widescreen editions. According to DVDTown, the DVD included six behind-the-scenes featurettes. As of July 12, 2009, 1,125,422 DVD units have been sold, gathering revenue of $18,223,621. A Blu-ray version was released on November 23, 2010.

References

External links

 
 
 
 
 
 

2006 plays
2009 films
2009 comedy-drama films
American comedy-drama films
American action comedy films
American satirical films
Films set in Georgia (U.S. state)
Films shot in Atlanta
Films directed by Tyler Perry
Films scored by Aaron Zigman
American films based on plays
American sequel films
Lionsgate films
Films with screenplays by Tyler Perry
African-American films
2000s English-language films
2000s American films